Dario Simoni (1901 – May 23, 1984) was a set decorator. He won two Academy Awards and was nominated for another two in the category Best Art Direction.

Selected filmography
Simoni won two Academy Awards for Best Art Direction and was nominated for another two:
Won
 Lawrence of Arabia (1962)
 Doctor Zhivago (1965)

Nominated
 The Agony and the Ecstasy (1965)
 The Taming of the Shrew (1967)

References

External links

1901 births
1984 deaths
American set decorators
Best Art Direction Academy Award winners